Bloomfield Tech High School (also Essex County Bloomfield Tech or Bloomfield Tech) is a regional public high school located in Bloomfield, that offered occupational and academic instruction for students in Essex County, New Jersey, United States, as part of the Essex County Vocational Technical Schools. The school was also home to the first Green Energy Academy in a high school setting, which opened in 2009. The district offered adult programs in the evening at Bloomfield Tech.

As of the 2016-17 school year, the school had an enrollment of 483 students and 40.5 classroom teachers (on an FTE basis), for a student–teacher ratio of 11.9:1. There were 296 students (61.3% of enrollment) eligible for free lunch and 86 (17.8% of students) eligible for reduced-cost lunch.

At the end of the 2017-18 school year, Bloomfield Tech High School closed along with North 13th Street Tech and has been replaced by the newly constructed Donald M. Payne Sr. School of Technology in Newark. However the students and staff of West Caldwell Tech will occupy Bloomfield Tech as the West Caldwell school building is being renovated.

Awards, recognition and rankings
In 2015, Bloomfield Tech was one of 15 schools in New Jersey, and one of nine public schools, recognized as a National Blue Ribbon School in the exemplary high performing category by the United States Department of Education.

During the 2009–10 school year, Bloomfield Tech High School was also awarded the Blue Ribbon School Award of Excellence by the United States Department of Education, the highest award an American school can receive.

Schooldigger.com ranked the school tied for 102nd out of 381 public high schools statewide in its 2011 rankings (an increase of 58 positions from the 2010 ranking) which were based on the combined percentage of students classified as proficient or above proficient on the mathematics (83.9%) and language arts literacy (99.1%) components of the High School Proficiency Assessment (HSPA).

Athletics
The Bloomfield Tech Spartans compete in the Super Essex Conference, which is comprised of public and private high schools in Essex County and was established following a reorganization of sports leagues in Northern New Jersey by the New Jersey State Interscholastic Athletic Association (NJSIAA). With 400 students in grades 10-12, the school was classified by the NJSIAA for the 2015-16 school year as North II, Group I for most athletic competition purposes, which included schools with an enrollment of 73 to 481 students in that grade range.

The girls basketball team won the Group I state championship in 2004 (against runner-up Riverside High School in the playoff finals), 2005 (vs. Salem High School), 2006 (vs. Salem) and 2009 (vs. Gloucester City High School). The three state title from 2004 to2006 are toed for the sixth-longest streak in state history. In 2004, the girls' basketball team took the North II, Group I sectional title with a 70-44 win against Belvidere High School and went on to win the Group I state title with a 71-59 win against Riverside in the championship game played at the Ritacco Center. The team repeated as winner of the North II Group I title in 2005 with a 58-46 win against University High School.

The boys basketball team won the Group I state championship in 2003 (defeating Paulsboro High School in the tournament finals), 2004 (vs. Burlington City High School), 2006 (vs. LEAP Academy University Charter School) and 2007 (vs. Create Charter High School). After trailing by as many as 15 points, the team won the 2013 Group I title against Paulsboro by a 61-59 score in the playoff finals, with the winning basket coming as a buzzer beater to earn the program's first state championship. The team won the 2007 North II, Group I state sectional championship with a 78-74 win over Science Park High School. The team won the 2007 Group I state championship with a 73-59 win over Create Charter High School.

The boys and girls' basketball teams both won their respective Group I state championships in 2006, the boys defeating LEAP Academy University Charter School of Camden, 73-51, and the girls topping Salem High School.

Administration
Core members of the school's administration are:
Ayisha Ingram-Robinson – Principal

Notable alumni
 Da'Sean Butler (born 1987), basketball player for Hapoel Be'er Sheva of the Israeli Premier League who was drafted by the Miami Heat in 2010.
 Hector Santiago (born 1987; class of 2006), starting pitcher for the Los Angeles Angels.
 Herb Scherer (1929–2012), professional basketball player for the Tri-Cities Blackhawks and New York Knicks.

References

External links
Bloomfield Tech High School
Essex County Vocational Technical Schools

Statistical data for the Essex County Vocational Technical Schools, National Center for Education Statistics

Bloomfield, New Jersey
Public high schools in Essex County, New Jersey
Vocational schools in New Jersey